Andrea Elizabeth Scacco Carrasco (born July 8, 1986) is an Ecuadorian politician who was elected to be the Mayor of Ibarra.

Life
Scacco was born in Ibarra in 1986.

She was elected to be the new mayor of Ibarra in March 2019 hoping to reduce xenophobia and to create a women's refuge in the city.

During her administration plans have started to create a new cemetery in the parish of Guayaquil de Alpachaca. This is required because the city's municipal cemetery is full. Scacco noted that the cemetery would not be completed until the next administration.

In 2022 an allegation was made that she had been involved in the sale of a job in her administration. It was alleged that her mother had said that the person who got the job (but who was later fired) had spoken of returning money to the employee.

References

1986 births
Living people
People from Ibarra, Ecuador
Mayors of places in Ecuador
Ecuadorian women in politics